Nikolina Kursar (5 August 1991) is a Norwegian taekwondo practitioner. 
She competed at the 2009 and 2011 World Taekwondo Championships.
She won a bronze medal in welterweight at the 2009 World Taekwondo Championships in Copenhagen.

References

External links

1991 births
Living people
Norwegian female taekwondo practitioners
World Taekwondo Championships medalists
21st-century Norwegian women